Actually, You Can is the seventeenth studio album by the experimental rock band Deerhoof.

Track listing

References 

2021 albums
Deerhoof albums
Joyful Noise Recordings albums